Joseph LaPalombara (born May 18, 1925) is an American political scientist who specializes in comparative politics, group interest theory, and the foreign investments made by global firms. He is the Arnold Wolfers Professor Emeritus of Political Science and Management at Yale University, where he has been teaching for over fifty years. LaPalombara has twice chaired the political science department at Yale and has also served as the director of the Yale's Institution for Social and Policy Studies. Prior to joining Yale in 1964, LaPalombara spent three years (1947-1950) at Oregon State University and an additional eleven years (1953-1964) at Michigan State University. At the latter institution he also chaired (1957-1962) the political science department.

For his research, writing and teaching about Italy, LaPalombara was named a knight and then a knight-commander in that country's Order of Merit society.  He has been a vice-president of the American Political Science Association; the President of the Conference Group for the Study of Italian Politics and Society; and is a member of the American Academy of Arts and Sciences as well as a member of the New York Council on Foreign Policy.

Early life and education 

The son of Italian immigrants, LaPalombara grew up on the mean streets of Chicago's Near West Side. Like most of his age peers, he dropped out of high school at age sixteen, following which he worked in a variety of industrial plants. He learned in those plants a large range of specialized industrial occupations, including the treatment of steels as high temperatures.

LaPalombara, a high-school dropout, spent the years of World War II at specialized jobs in defense industries. A special wartime-related admissions program of the University of Illinois permitted him to enroll in and eventually to graduate (with highest honors) from that institution. In addition to his academic honors (e.g., Phi Kappa Phi, Phi Beta Kappa, Bronze Tablet), LaPalombara was also president of the Student Senate and of his Senior Class. Following a short teaching stint (1947-1950) at Oregon State University, LaPalombara enrolled at Princeton University, the institution from which (1954) he was awarded the Ph.D. degree.

Career 

LaPalombara's professional career encompasses teaching and research, extensive consulting, and experience in entrepreneurship as well as in diplomacy.   His teaching in the United States has included visiting-professorships at the University of California (Berkeley) and Columbia University.  In Italy he has been a visiting-professor at the universities of Florence and Catania, as well as the John Cabot University at Rome, and that same city's Free University (LUISS). Most recently, LaPalombara also taught at the University of Bergamo.

LaPalombara's earliest consulting involved governmental agencies such as the Foreign Service Institute, the Agency for International Development and the Central Intelligence Agency. Earlier in his career, he was a consultant to the Ford and the Rockefeller foundations, the Social Science Research Council, and other major American foundations. He later shifted his consulting to the private industrial sphere, beginning with a stint as a senior advisor to the National Industrial Conference Board of New York.

There then followed consultancies with U.S. corporations like IBM, Exxon-Mobil, E.R. Grace, Union Carbide, Praxair, General Electric and many others. In Italy his corporate clients have included ENI (Ente Nazionale Idrocarburi), Telecom Italia, FIAT and SIAD (Bergamo). Consultancies led him eventually to become a founder and first president of a New York consultancy, Multinational Strategies, Incorporated.  In diplomacy he did a short stint (1980-1981) as First Secretary in charge of the cultural section of the U.S. Embassy, at Rome, Italy.

At Yale, in the early 1970s, LaPalombara joined with other faculty who favored the creation of the Yale School of Management (SOM). He taught in SOM for five years at that time, and again just before he formally retired in the year 2001. Since that time, and in every academic year that followed, he has taught  for advanced undergraduate students a seminar on the overseas investments of global firms.

Scholarship 

LaPalombara has been a leading figure in the sphere of political science denominated "comparative politics." He was for many years a member of the SSRC's well-regarded Committee on Comparative Politics. The Committee functioned as one aspect of a so-called behavioral revolution which pointed in a more empirical direction the comparative study of political systems. Along that same vein, LaPalombara also published (1974) a heralded textbook, Politics Within Nations a tome that sought to light the way to a more realistic study of the politics of many countries.

His research has been characterized by extensive writing on the topic of interest-group theory, and its application to political phenomenon both in the United States and abroad. LaPalombara in 1950 published both a monograph and an article in the American Political Science Review on the interest-group-centered study of political dynamics. He published, in English and in Rivista Italiana di Politiche Pubbliche, another article on this subject in 2017.

Research 

LaPalombara has conducted extensive research inside the United States, as well as internationally in countries such as Italy and Vietnam. His research and writing on Italy has won him many awards; further, the publication of Democracy Italian Style (Yale University Press, 1987) won him plaudits from writers like Gore Vidal and Umberto Eco.

For Prentice-Hall, LaPalombara once edited a series of short books, depicting what was new and important in comparative politics. Widely recognized and admired scholars wrote for this series.  The latter included  Karl Friedrich, Henry Ehrman, Jean Blondel, James Scott, Philip Shively, Robert Putnam as well as others. It helped that this was also a time when the Yale political science department numbered several brilliant scholars of worldwide renown.
Along with his consultancies came another intellectual gear shift in LaPalombara's research and teaching. His attention turned to the important role played by multinational corporations, or global firms—both in the international economy and in the evolutionary prospects of LDCs, or less developed countries. LaPalombara coauthored several books with Stephen Blank which were then issued by the National Industrial Conference Board. All of them address problems, at home and abroad, created by foreign direct investments made by American and foreign international firms. The field has exploded since a time when LaPalombara was among its pioneers.

LaPalombara's scholarship is in part reflected in the many books he has written or co-edited. They join the several hundred journal articles and book chapters he has published, to establish him as a significant scholar in his field (see list below).

Another aspect of his commitment to scholarly writing is LaPalombara's current membership on the editorial boards of the Yale Review and of the Journal of International Business Education. Indeed, he serves as the U.S. editor of the latter journal. He is also a founding member of the Italian Social Science Council. In this regard, and along with several other Italian and American scholars, the CSS Committee arguably served to introduce in Italy advanced research methods in all of the social sciences. Indeed, before the CNN and the U.S.-Italian effort that it involved, there did not exist post-graduate training in the social sciences.

Journalism 

In addition to his experience as a teacher, an academic researcher, or an industrial consultant, LaPalombara has sought to use journalism to further the systematic empirical study of the political process. He has therefore published hundreds of articles for Corriere della Sera, La Repubblica, Il Messaggero and many other Italian newspapers and magazines. For many years he was both the U.S. editor and then editor-in-chief of Italy Italy, a periodical designed to show that Italy is much more than a beautiful country of pasta, pizza, perfumes and high fashion. For many years, LaPalombara, as editor, published introductions to numbers of this magazine. As a consultant for several financial groups, LaPalombara also provided a running analysis of what might be transpiring, politically, in Italy.

Honors and accolades 

LaPalombara has been honored not only by the Republic of Italy, which has welcomed him into its distinguished association for the Order of Merit. He is also a recipient of medals from the Senate and from the Constituational Court of Italy. He is a member of the New York Council on Foreign Relations. He has been a member of CSS (The Italian Social Science Council), and the Center for Advanced Study of the Behavioral Sciences. He has been on the National Committee for American Foreign Policy as well as a former member of the Board of Trustees of the American Academy in Rome. He once directed with distinction the SSRC's Foreign Area Fellowship Program. The latter was responsible, over the years, for bringing a large number of young scholars into the world of teaching and scholarship.

The Guggenheim Foundation once recognized LaPalombara's scholarship by awarding him a coveted fellowship. He was once similarly honored by Princeton University, by the Fulbright Commission, by the Twentieth Century Fund, by the Ford Foundation and by the Rockefeller Foundation. He is currently the American president of Reset Dialogues-USA, a non-profit organization devoted to closing the gap between the Arab world and other Western ethnicities. He is currently on the Board of Directors of the Center for American Studies (Rome, Italy).

Selected publications

Books

Articles and chapters 
 "Political Party Systems and Crisis Governments", Mid-West Journal of Political Science, Volume 2 (May, 1958).
 "Conceptual and Operational Shortcomings of the Political Elite Model", in Political Sociology. Fourth World Congress of Sociology Proceedings, Associazione Italiana de Scienze Sociali, 1959.

 "The Comparative Roles of Groups in Political Systems", SSEC Items, Vol. 15 (June 1969).
 "Italy: Fragmentation, Isolation and Alienation", in L. Pye and S. Verba (eds.), Political Cultural and Political Development (Princeton, 1965), chapter 8.
 "Decline of Ideology; A Dissent and an Interpretation", American Political Science Review, Vol. 60 (March 1966).

 "Political Power and Political Development", Yale Law Review, Vol. 78 (July 1969), pp. 1253–1275.
 "Values and Ideologies in the Administrative Evolution of Western Constitutional Systems", in R. Braibanti (ed.), Political and Administrative Development (Durham, 1969).
 "Parsimony and Empiricism in Comparative Politics: An Anti-Scholastic View", in R. Holt and J. Turner (eds.), Methodology of Comparative Political Research (New York, 1969).
 "Macro-Theories and Micro-Applications in Comparative Politics", in L.J. Cantori (ed.), Comparative Political Systems (Boston: Holbrook Press, 1974).
 "Political Participation as an Analytical Concept in Comparative Politics", in L. Pye and S. Verba (eds.), The Citizen and Politics: A Comparative Perspective (Stamford, CT: Greylock, Inc., 1978).

 "Political Analysis and Forecasting in the Private Sector: An Overview of the New Firm-Centric Analytical Formats", Vierteljahresberichte (December 1982).
 "Totalitarianism: Some Enduring Conceptual Muddles". Global Perspectives Vol. 2 (Fall 1984).

 "Anti-Americanism in Europe: Corporate and National Dimensions". American Foreign Policy Interests. Vol. 26 (August 2004).
 "A Global Rx for Corporate Maladies". US Italia Weekly. 2006.

 "The Organization 'Gap' in Political Science", in G. King, K.L. Scholzman and N. Nye (eds.), The Future of Political Science: 100 Perspectives. (New York and London: Rutledge, 2009).
 "Italy, It's That Way If You Think So", Italian Politics and Society. Spring 2012.

See also 

 Comparative Politics
 Political Systems
 Political Psychology
 Italian Politics
 International Industrial Management
 Multinational Corporation Operations

References

External links 
 Yale Biography

Yale University faculty
Living people
American political scientists
Place of birth missing (living people)
1925 births